The Play-offs of the 2012 Fed Cup Europe/Africa Zone Group III were the final stages of the Group III Zonal Competition involving teams from Europe and Africa. Using the positions determined in their pools, the seven teams faced off to determine their placing in the 2012 Fed Cup Europe/Africa Zone Group III. The top two teams advanced to Fed Cup Europe/Africa Zone Group II.

Promotion play-offs
The first and second placed teams of each pool were drawn in head-to-head rounds. The winner of each round advanced to Group II in 2013.

Morocco vs. Lithuania

Tunisia vs. Ireland

5th to 7th play-offs
The third and fourth placed teams of each pool were drawn in head-to-head rounds to find the equal fifth and seventh placed teams.

Malta vs. Moldova

Armenia vs. Egypt

9th to 10th play-offs
The fifth placed teams of each pool were drawn in head-to-head rounds to find the ninth and tenth placed teams.

Kenya vs. Cyprus

Final Placements

See also
Fed Cup structure

References

External links
 Fed Cup website

2012 Fed Cup Europe/Africa Zone